Michael W. Hawkins  is the current Bishop of Saskatchewan. He was previously, from 2001 to 2009, the Dean of Saskatchewan and Rector of St Alban's Cathedral.

Hawkins studied at Dalhousie University and the University of King's College in Halifax before becoming a Master of Divinity at Trinity College, Toronto. He was ordained as a deacon in 1988 and a priest in June 1989. He then served as rector of Pugwash and River John from 1988 to 1993 and Petite Rivière and New Dublin from 1993 to 2001 in the Diocese of Nova Scotia and Prince Edward Island. In 2001 he was appointed rector of St. Alban's Cathedral, Prince Albert and Dean of Saskatchewan. He was consecrated Bishop of Saskatchewan on 6 March 2009.

In 2009, Hawkins received an honorary doctorate from the University of King's College.

Hawkins is a trustee of the Elliott House of Studies.

References

Anglican Church of Canada deans
Anglican bishops of Saskatchewan
21st-century Anglican Church of Canada bishops
Living people
Year of birth missing (living people)